Calochortus subalpinus, the subalpine mariposa lily, is a North American species of flowering plants in the lily family native to the northwestern United States (States of Washington and Oregon).

Description
Calochortus subalpinus is a perennial herb producing an unbranched stem up to about 30 centimeters tall. Flowers are white to pale lavender with white and orange hairs on the petals.

References

External links

Turner Photographics Pacific Northwest Wildflowers
Pacific Bulb Society, Calochortus Species Six photos of several species including Calochortus subalpinus

subalpinus
Flora of the Northwestern United States
Plants described in 1906
Flora without expected TNC conservation status